TJ Neubauer (born in Glen Arm, Maryland) is a professional lacrosse player with the Rochester Rattlers of Major League Lacrosse. He was a 2016 USILA All-America while playing for Fairfield University.

High school
Neubauer attended Loyola Blakefield High School in Baltimore, Maryland where he earned three varsity letters. He earned US Lacrosse All-America accolades after his junior season. During his senior season he served as team captain while earning the Dons Coaches Award for Most Outstanding Player and All-Kudda Team honor.

College
Neubauer graduated from Fairfield University where he ranks third in program history with 109 goals and tenth with 122 points. As a senior captain, Neubauer was named an USILA All-America Honorable Mention, USILA North/South All-Star, First Team All-NEILA, and First Team All-CAA.

Professional
Neubauer was the 34th selection of the 2016 MLL Collegiate Draft by the Rochester Rattlers.

References

External links
Rochester Rattlers profile
Fairfield Stags profile

Major League Lacrosse players
Living people
American lacrosse players
Fairfield Stags men's lacrosse players
Rochester Rattlers players
People from Baltimore County, Maryland
Year of birth missing (living people)